The following lists events that happened in 1943 in Iceland.

Incumbents
Monarch - Kristján X
Prime Minister – Björn Þórðarson

Events

Births

13 February – Tómas Ingi Olrich, politician.
15 April – Reynir Jónsson, footballer
14 May – Ólafur Ragnar Grímsson, politician
29 June – Baldvin Baldvinsson, footballer
19 August – Þór Whitehead, historian
18 October – Friðrik Klemenz Sophusson, politician
26 December – Jón Bjarnason, politician

Deaths

References

 
1940s in Iceland
Iceland
Iceland
Years of the 20th century in Iceland